Quirijn or Quiringh Gerritsz van Brekelenkam (1622/29, Zwammerdam – 1669/79, Leiden), was a Dutch Baroque genre painter. He probably studied under Gerard Dou, and as a result his paintings from the 1640s and 1650s are similar to those of the Leiden fijnschilders.

References

 Elizabeth Alice Honig, "Brekelenkam, Quiringh [Quirijn] (Gerritsz.) van," in Jane Shoaf Turner (ed.), From Rembrandt to Vermeer: 17th-Century Dutch Artists, The Grove dictionary of art. New York: St. Martin's Press (2000): 59–60.

External links

Works and literature on Quirijn van Brekelenkam
Vermeer and The Delft School, a full text exhibition catalog from The Metropolitan Museum of Art, which contains material on Quirijn van Brekelenkam

1620s births
1670s deaths
Dutch Golden Age painters
Dutch male painters
Dutch genre painters
People from Alphen aan den Rijn